The 1610s decade ran from January 1, 1610, to December 31, 1619.

References